Dorippidae is a small family of crabs, containing the following genera (extinct genera marked "†"):

† Archaeocypoda Secretan, 1975
† Bartethusa Quayle & Collins, 1981
Dorippe Weber, 1795
Dorippoides Serène & Romimohtarto, 1969
† Eodorippe Glaessner, 1980
Heikeopsis Ng, Guinot & Davie, 2008
† Hillius Bishop, 1983b
Medorippe Manning & Holthuis, 1981
Neodorippe Serène & Romimohtarto, 1969
Nobilum Serène & Romimohtarto, 1969
Paradorippe Serène & Romimohtarto, 1969
Philippidorippe H. Chen, 1986
Phyllodorippe Manning & Holthuis, 1981
† Sodakus Bishop, 1978
† Telamonocarcinus Larghi, 2004
† Tepexicarcinus Feldmann, Vega, Applegate & Bishop, 1998
† Titanodorippe Blow & Manning, 1996

References

Crabs
Decapod families